The Helen Blazes archaeological site is an archaeological site near Lake Hell 'n Blazes in Brevard County, Florida, United States, which was excavated in the 1950s. Stone artifacts from Paleo-Indians (prior to 8000 BCE), the Archaic period (8000 BCE to 1000 BCE) and later cultures were found at the site. The Paleo-Indian artifacts included numerous Suwannee points. The Paleo-Indian artifacts were found in the same kind of deposits as were similar artifacts in Melbourne ( to the northeast) and Vero Beach ( to the south of Melbourne), both of which also yielded human and pleistocene animal fossils.

References

Further reading

Archaic period in North America
Hell'n Blazes